Hunter Maldonado (born March 24, 1999) is an American college basketball player for the Wyoming Cowboys of the Mountain West Conference (MWC).

High school career
Maldonado attended Vista Ridge High School in Colorado Springs, Colorado. As a junior, he averaged 22.6 points, 6.9 rebounds and two steals per game, helping lead Vista Ridge to a 20–7 record and a berth in the 4A state semifinals. Maldonado was named The Gazette 5A-4A Boys' Basketball Peak Performer of the Year. He scored 37 points in a loss to Pueblo West High School. Regarded as a two-star recruit, in June 2016, Maldonado committed to playing college basketball for Wyoming. He had received interest from several other Division I programs and a scholarship offer from Division II Colorado–Colorado Springs.

College career
Maldonado averaged 5.3 points and 2.2 rebounds per game as a freshman, making 19 starts. As a sophomore, Maldonado averaged 13.8 points and 6.8 rebounds per game in eight games. However, his season was ended by a sprained knee ligament and back spasms, and he took a medical redshirt. On November 5, 2019, he scored a season-high 32 points in a 54–40 win over Idaho State. Maldonado averaged 15.8 points, 5.8 rebounds, and four assists per game as a redshirt sophomore, while shooting 42 percent from the field. He was a Third Team All-Mountain West selection by the league media. In the offseason, he trained alongside Colorado's D'Shawn Schwartz and CJ Jennings of Saint Martin's University. On December 12, 2020, he scored a season-high 30 points in a 93–88 win over Utah Valley. As a redshirt junior, Maldonado averaged 12.5 points per game, and led Wyoming with 6.8 rebounds and 4.6 assists per game. On January 31, 2022, he scored a career-high 35 points in a 84–78 overtime win against Colorado State. Maldonado was named to the First Team All-Mountain West as a fifth-year senior.

On March 22, 2022, Maldonado declared for the 2022 NBA draft while maintaining his college eligibility, but later withdrew from the draft after little to no interest from NBA teams. NBA teams generally do not think that he can compete at the next level.

On February 9, 2023, he scored 17 points in a 69-59 loss to UNLV and became the fifth player in program history to pass the 2,000-point threshold. He passed this threshold while playing six seasons with the Cowboys, significantly longer than the previous players who have passed this threshold.

Career statistics

College

|-
| style="text-align:left;"| 2017–18
| style="text-align:left;"| Wyoming
| 29 || 19 || 21.2 || .388 || .304 || .735 || 2.2 || 1.4 || 1.0 || .2 || 5.3
|-
| style="text-align:left;"| 2018–19
| style="text-align:left;"| Wyoming
| 8 || 5 || 32.5 || .420 || .333 || .625 || 6.8 || 2.3 || 1.1 || .5 || 13.8
|-
| style="text-align:left;"| 2019–20
| style="text-align:left;"| Wyoming
| 33 || 33 || 35.3 || .422 || .295 || .708 || 5.8 || 4.0 || 1.2 || .5 || 15.8
|-
| style="text-align:left;"| 2020–21
| style="text-align:left;"| Wyoming
| 25 || 25 || 35.8 || .419 || .200 || .694 || 6.8 || 4.6 || 1.2 || .4 || 12.5
|-
| style="text-align:left;"| 2021–22
| style="text-align:left;"| Wyoming
| 33 || 33 || 37.3 || .495 || .250 || .711 || 5.7 || 6.3 || 1.2 || .1 || 18.5
|-
| style="text-align:left;"| 2022–23
| style="text-align:left;"| Wyoming
| 29 || 29 || 34.6 || .481 || .338 || .753 || 4.8 || 4.0 || 1.4 || .3 || 15.6
|- class="sortbottom"
| style="text-align:center;" colspan="2"| Career
| 157 || 144 || 32.9 || .449 || .283 || .715 || 5.1 || 4.0 || 1.2 || .3 || 13.7

References

External links
 Wyoming Cowboys bio

1999 births
Living people
American men's basketball players
Basketball players from Colorado Springs, Colorado
Shooting guards
Wyoming Cowboys basketball players